Dragan Jakovljević (born 18 April 1973) is a Serbian professional basketball coach. He currently serves as a head coach for Mladost Zemun of the Basketball League of Serbia and the ABA League Second Division.

Coaching career 
Jakovljević spent the first 19 years of his coaching career working with youth system. Almost the entire time, he spent with the Belgrade-based Žitko Basket. The only time out of Žitko Basket was in the 2013–14 season when he coached Crvena zvezda U16 team.

On 24 July 2019, Jakovljević was named the head coach for Mladost Zemun of the Basketball League of Serbia.

References

External links
 Dragan Jakovljevic at aba-liga.com
 Dragan Jakovljevic at eurobasket.com

1973 births
Living people
KK Crvena zvezda youth coaches
KK Mladost Zemun coaches
Serbian men's basketball coaches
Sportspeople from Belgrade